The sixth season of You Can Dance – Po prostu Tańcz began on 2 March 2011 on TVN. The dancers compete to win PLN 100,000 and a 3-month scholarship in dance school Broadway Dance Center, but first they have to go through auditions. Later, 36 contestants do the workshops abroad – this season in Casablanca, Morocco. This seasons on choreography camp special guest choreographer was Tyce Diorio. From fourteen people, two dancers are eliminated in each episode, to the final episode that features the top 2 contestants. For the first time the show is hosted by Patricia Kazadi. The judges are Agustin Egurolla, Michał Piróg and Kinga Rusin who joined the panel after hosting the five previous seasons.

Auditions
Open auditions for this season were held in the following locations:

The song during Sneak Peeks at the end of the episode is Just Lose It – Eminem

Top 36 dancers
During the auditions judges picked 36 dancers. These dancers were taking part in choreography camp in Morocco.

These dancers were shown only in youcandance.tvn.pl website extras.

These dancers earned the tickets after choreography round.

Returning Dancers
This season there were some returning dancers, who were trying their chances last seasons.

Choreography Camp (Casablanca) week 
Judges: Agustin Egurolla, Kinga Rusin, Michał Piróg

Eliminations during Choreography Camp

Dancers were practising choreographies during first three days of the Camp. Then there were no cuts, judges gave some dancers, who didn't handle the choreographies well yellow cards, second yellow equals red card.
After rehearsals contestants performed in every style they practiced, after every style judges cut dancers.
After these cuts remaining contestants went to Marakesh to Final Choreography round with Tyce Diorio

Red Cards: Marcos De Lima, Aleksander Tyburek,
Cuts after Hip-Hop: Maciej Kuchta, 
Cuts after Jazz: Paweł Kofman, Tomasz Piotrowski, Natalia Serhej, Sonja Mirpuri, Edyta Wajer 
Cuts after Salsa: Patryk Rybarski, Szymon Pasterski, 
Cuts after Final Choreography round: Kamil Piotrowski, Grzegorz Cherubiński, Dominika Cybulska, Michalina Twarowska, Kinga Biegańska
Cuts after dancing for live: Piotr Nowicki, Martyna Kapral, Joanna Kozłowska, Sonja Felbur

Top 14 Contestants

Women

Men

Elimination chart

Note: Because of back injury Michał Maciejewski had to leave the competition. He was replaced by the male dancer, who was eliminated last week – Sebastian Piotrowicz. According to So You Think You Can Dance rules he will be allowed to come back next season, but not straight to the top 14, but only to audition.

Performance nights

Week 1: Top 14 Showcase (13 April 2011)

Group Dance: Forget You — Cee Lo Green (Jazz; Choreographer: Geneviève Dorion-Coupal)
Musical Performance: Patricia Kazadi – Look Around
Guest Dancers:
Jakub Jóżwiak & Paulina Figińska – season 5 Winner & Runner-Up (Contemporary) – La Ritournelle – Sebastian Tellier
Along with Patricia Kazadi performed 12 dancers from previous seasons: Marcin Mrożiński, Tomasz Prządka (season 3) ; Anna Kapera, Klaudia "Jadżka" Koruba, Rafał Kabungwe, Julia Żytko (season 4); Ilona Bekier; Aleksander Paliński; Jakub Piotrowicz; Adam Kościelniak; Katarzyna Bień; Leal Zielińska (season 5). The routine was choreographed by Agustin Egurolla
Top 14 Couple dances:

This episode there were no eliminations, but Judges have picked the best and the worst performance of the week. The public voted and picked the best performance of the week
According to Judges:
The Best Couple Performance: Masha Tryputsen & Michał Maciejewski
Results of Voting
The Best Couple Performance: Masha Tryputsen & Michał Maciejewski

Week 2: Top 14 (20 April 2011)

Group Dance: I Get It In — Omarion ft. Gucci Mane (Krump; Choreographer: Kwame "Big Wave" Osai)
Top 14 Couple dances:

# – This week Paulina Przestrzelska did not perform due to her knee injury. She was replaced by Anna Kapera – season 4 winner. She will be in bottom 3 next week.

Bottom 3 Couples solos:

Eliminated:
Magdalena Wójcik
Dariusz Bujnowski

Week 3: Top 12 (27 April 2011)

Group Dance: Till The World Ends — Britney Spears (Wacking; Choreographer: Matt Cady)
Top 12 Couple dances:

#1 – This week Adrian Wilczko did not perform due to his injury. He was replaced by Łukasz Zięba – season 4 Runner-Up. He will be in bottom 3 next week.	
#2 – Paulina Przestrzelska had to perform the solo because of last week absence.

Bottom 3 Couples solos:

Eliminated:
Anna Tomczak
Paweł Tolak

Week 4: Top 10 (4 May 2011)
Group Dance: Sherlock Holmes theme – Hans Zimmer (Jazz; Choreographer: Paweł Michno)
Guest Dancers:
Natalia Pełka – 10-year-old girl who auditioned in Warsaw. She performed with Marcin Mrożiński and Tomasz Prządka – (both season 3) – Fergalicious – Fergie
Top 10 Couple dances:

# – Adrian Wilczko a had to perform the solo because of last week absence.

Bottom 3 Couples solos:

Eliminated:
Agnieszka Szewczyk
Adrian Wilczko

Week 5: Top 8 (11 May 2011)
Group Dances:

Top 8 Couple dances:

Bottom 3 Couples solos:

Eliminated:
Alisa Floryńska
Jakub Pursa

Week 6: Top 6 (18 May 2011)
Group Dance: Runnin – Lil Wayne ft. Shanell (Contemporary; Choreographer: Geneviève Dorion-Coupal)
Couple dances:

Top 6's solos:

Eliminated:
Masha Tryputsen
Sebastian Piotrowicz

Week 7: Semi-Finale – Top 4 (25 May 2011)
Group Dance: Judas – Lady Gaga (Choreographer: Thierry Verger)
Guest Dancer:
DzikiStyl Company – Dancers from previous seasons: Patryk Gacki (season 1), Wioletta Fiuk (season 3 winner), Kamil Kowalski, Paulina Figińska and Jakub Jóżwiak (season 5) along with Mikołaj Wieczór and Angelika Paradowska – Eye for an Eye – Unkle from "Dzieci innego Boga"
Couple dances:

Top 4's solos:

Eliminated:
Anna Tarnowska
Sebastian Piotrowicz

Week 8: Finale – Top 2 (1 June 2011)
Guest Dancer:
Patryk Rybarski (Top 36) & Katarzyna "Mila" Kordzińska (season 2) – Pole dance	– Another Way To Die – Alicia Keys ft. Jack White
Group dances:

Top 2 Couple dances:

Top 2 solos:

Results:
Winner: Dominik Olechowski
Runner Up: Paulina Przestrzelska

Special Episode

Taniec kontra Dance (Dance vs. Dance!) (11 June 2011)

This episode was live from Białystok. There were two teams – professional dancers from Dancing with the Stars (Taniec z Gwiazdam) and You Can Dance: Po prostu tańcz! dancers. DWTS team leader was Rafał Maserak (DWTS dancer) and YCD team Patricia Kazadi (YCD presenter). Piotr Gąsowski (DWTS presenter) was the presenter this show.

Judges:
 Michał Piróg – So You Think You Can Dance
 Maja Sablewska – X Factor
 Piotr Galiński – Dancing with the Stars
Musical Guests: X Factor finalists:
William Malcolm – "Mercy"
Ada Szulc – "Don't Stop the Music"
Michał Szpak – "I Don't Wanna Miss a Thing"
Contestants:
You Can Dance Group:
Ilona Bekier (season 5)
Ada Kawecka (season 3)
Klaudia Koruba (season 4)
Anna Kapera (season 4 WINNER)
Maria Foryś (season 1)
Leal Zielińska (season 5)
Marcin Mroziński (season 3)
Karol Niecikowski (season 3)
Tomasz Prządka (season 3)
Adam Kościelniak (season 5)
Aleksander Paliński (season 5)
Rafał Kamiński (season 1)
Dancing with the Stars Group:
 Izabela Janachowska (season 9–12)
 Janja Lesar (season 8–10,12)
 Anna Głogowska (season 1–3, 7–8, 10–12)
 Magdalena Soszyńska-Michno (season 1–3, 5–9, 11–12)
 Paulina Biernat (season 11)
 Nina Tyrka (season 7 & 12)
 Robert Rowiński (season 3–4, 6, 11–12)
 Jan Kliment (season 10–12)
 Stefano Terrazzino (season 4–6, 8, 11)
 Krzysztof Hulboj (season 8–10, 12)
 Michał Uryniuk (season 7)
 Cezary Olszewski (season 7–10, 12)
Special performance: So You Think You Can Dance (Poland) (season 6) Top 14 dancers: Yeah 3x – Chris Brown (Hip-Hop); Choreographer: Matt Cady

Results:
1st Place: Dancing with the Stars team
2nd Plance: You Can Dance team

First for any So You Think You Can Dance series
On Top 6 show there was first ever reggaeton routine, it was danced by Anna Tarnowska & Sebastian Piotrowicz.

Rating figures

External links
So You Think You Can Dance Poland Official Website

Season 06